Weigelt is a surname. Notable people with the surname include:

Benjamin Weigelt (born 1982), German footballer
Henri Weigelt (born 1998), German footballer
Horst Weigelt (born 1934), German Protestant theologian 
Liane Buhr (née Weigelt, born 1956), German rowing coxswain

See also
Weigel